Geriatric Orthopaedic Surgery & Rehabilitation is a bimonthly peer-reviewed medical journal that covers the field of Orthopedics. The journal's editor-in-chief is Stephen L. Kates (University of Rochester Medical Center). It has been in publication since 2010 and is currently published by SAGE Publications.

External links

SAGE Publishing academic journals
English-language journals
Orthopedics journals
Bimonthly journals
Gerontology journals